Jalan Sungai Danga (Johor State Route J106) is a major road in Johor, Malaysia.

List of junctions

Roads in Johor